Akif Raja (born 24 November 1992) is a Pakistani-born cricketer who plays for the United Arab Emirates national cricket team. He played in one first-class match for Lahore Shalimar in January 2014 in the 2013–14 Quaid-e-Azam Trophy in Pakistan.

In October 2021, he was named in the UAE's Twenty20 International (T20I) squad for the 2021 Summer T20 Bash tournament. He made his T20I debut on 8 October 2021, for the UAE against Ireland. In November 2021, he was named in the UAE's One Day International (ODI) squad for the 2021 Namibia Tri-Nation Series.

In February 2022, Raja was named in the UAE's ODI squad for their series against Oman. He made his ODI debut on 6 February 2022, for the UAE against Oman.

References

External links
 
 

1992 births
Living people
Emirati cricketers
United Arab Emirates One Day International cricketers
United Arab Emirates Twenty20 International cricketers
Cricketers from Lahore
Pakistani emigrants to the United Arab Emirates
Pakistani expatriate sportspeople in the United Arab Emirates
Lahore Shalimar cricketers